GBB may refer to:
 Bourbon (group), a French shipping company
 Grand Beatbox Battle, a yearly worldwide beatbox competition
 Genes, Brain and Behavior, a scholarly journal
 Georgia Brass Band, an American band
 Global Aviation, a South African airline
 Global Business Brigades, an international development organization
 Kaytetye language
 Qabala International Airport, in Azerbaijan